The 1923 Tempe Normal Owls football team was an American football team that represented Tempe Normal School (later renamed Arizona State University) as an independent during the 1923 college football season. In their first season under head coach Aaron McCreary, the Owls compiled a 4–2 record and outscored their opponents by a combined total of 152 to 102. John Turner was the team captain.

Coach McCreary graduated from Temple Normal School in 1915 and had thereafter been in charge of athletics at Tucson High School.

Schedule

References

Tempe Normal
Arizona State Sun Devils football seasons
Tempe Normal Owls football